Jean-Pierre Lecompte (born in Saint-Junien, 1942) is a French former rugby league player, he usually played as centre or as wing.

Biography 
He played for Saint-Gaudens He also represented France during the 1968 Rugby League World Cup, including the final lost against Australia. Outside the game, he worked as an instructor at a driving school.

Honours 

 Rugby league :
 World Cup :
 Runner-up in 1968 (France).
 French Championship :
 Champion in 1970 (Saint-Gaudens).
 2 times finalist in 1966 and 1967 (Saint-Gaudens).

International caps

Cap details

References 

France national rugby league team players
Living people
1942 births
Sportspeople from Haute-Vienne
French rugby league players
Saint-Gaudens Bears players
Rugby league centres
Rugby league fullbacks